Francisco José Fernandes Costa (1867–1925) was a Portuguese lawyer and politician. He was a member of the Portuguese Republican Party and later of the Evolutionist Party, the Republican Liberal Party and the Nationalist Party. He was civil governor of Coimbra, minister of the Navy (1912–1913; 1915) and Commerce (1921). He is most remembered for being the President of the Ministry (Prime Minister) of the short-lived "five minutes government", who resigned the same day it was to take office, on 15 January 1920.

References

1867 births
1925 deaths
People from Lousã
Naval ministers of Portugal
Prime Ministers of Portugal
Agriculture ministers of Portugal
Portuguese Republican Party politicians
Portuguese republicans